The initials ISN can stand for:

 Bureau of International Security and Nonproliferation, in the U.S. Department of State
 Intel Software Network
 International Relations and Security Network
 International Socialist Network
 International Society for Neurochemistry
 International Society of Nephrology
 International Suppliers Network, a vendor tracking system
 Internment Serial Number for US prisoners during conflicts
 Irish Socialist Network
 Israel Start-Up Nation
 ITAD Subscriber Numbers for VoIP PBX
 Nicaraguan Sign Language

See also
 International Standard Number (disambiguation)